Sheung Tak is one of the 29 constituencies of the Sai Kung District Council in Hong Kong. The seat elects one member of the council every four years.

Since its creation in 1999, the boundary of the constituency is loosely based on the area of Sheung Tak Estate in Tseung Kwan O.

Councillors represented

Election results

2010s

2000s

1990s

References

 2011 District Council Election Results (Sai Kung)
 2007 District Council Election Results (Sai Kung)
 2003 District Council Election Results (Sai Kung)
 1999 District Council Election Results (Sai Kung)
 

Tseung Kwan O
Constituencies of Hong Kong
Constituencies of Sai Kung District Council
1999 establishments in Hong Kong
Constituencies established in 1999